Winston & Strawn LLP is an international law firm. Headquartered in Chicago, it has nearly 800 attorneys in ten offices in the United States and six offices in Europe and Asia. Founded in 1853, it is one of the largest and oldest law firms in Chicago.

The firm is known for its litigation practice across a variety of fields.

Offices
The firm's largest office by number of employees is Chicago. It maintains other U.S. offices in Charlotte, Dallas, Houston, Los Angeles, New York, San Francisco, and Silicon Valley, Miami and Washington, D.C., and international offices in Europe (Brussels, London, Moscow, Paris) and Asia (Hong Kong and Shanghai).

History and timeline 

Winston & Strawn LLP was founded in Chicago in 1853 by Frederick H. Winston, who was joined by the firm's other name partner, Silas H. Strawn, in 1892.

The white-shoe firm has made a series of mergers and opened additional offices. The firm operates in the Cravath System tradition, with practices such as lateral hiring.

Notable events in the firm's history include:

September 2000: Winston & Strawn acquires Breed, Abbott & Morgan, a law firm with a history dating back more than a century with offices in Greenwich, Connecticut and White Plains, New York.
 May 2012: 60 attorneys join from Dewey & LeBoeuf.
 2016: Winston & Strawn became the first Chicago law firm to match the record starting salary of $180,000 for first-year associates, beginning a "salary war" among large Chicago law firms after years of no change.
 2016: The firm announced a gender-neutral parental leave policy, allowing both male and female associates to take up to 20 weeks of paid parental leave within the first year of a child's life. 
 February 2017: Firm opens an office in Dallas with 23 partners from eight different law firms in Texas, the move described in the press as a "seismic shift" in the North Texas legal landscape.
 July–September 2017: Adds 12 partners to its employee benefits and executive compensation team, all from McDermott Will & Emery LLP.
 August 2017: A number of attorneys from the Latin America team of Chadbourne & Parke LLP's New York office leave to join Winston & Strawn's New York office.
 January 2020: Winston & Strawn announces the closure of their office in Dubai, which the firm opened four years earlier.
 June 2020: Joel Rubinstein, Jonathan Rochwarger, Elliott Smith and Daniel Nussen resigned to join White & Case, establishing its SPAC practice.
 August 2020: Winston & Strawn announced the formation of an Environmental, Social and Governance (ESG) Advisory Team, designed to assist companies navigate their ESG Profiles.
 2020: From mid-2020, the firm introduced austerity measures, including cuts to associate numbers and partner compensation, due to the COVID-19 pandemic.

Revenue
The firm's reported revenue was $985 million in 2017, a firm record. Its reported 2019 revenue was $1.01 billion. In 2020, during the COVID-19 pandemic, revenue decreased about three percent, to $981.2 million, and partner profits increased by more than four percent due to reduced expenses.

Notable representations 

Winston & Strawn has handled high-profile matters for its clients, including its organizing the Union Stockyard and Transit Company in 1894; challenging the War Powers Act in 1944 on behalf of department store Montgomery Ward; and representing the Atlanta Braves baseball franchise in 1966 litigation involving its relocation from Milwaukee to Atlanta. More recently:

 2017 - Achieved a favorable settlement for client Beef Products, Inc., BPI Technology, Inc., and Freezing Machines, Inc. (BPI) in a lawsuit against ABC News that has been described as "one of the most high-stakes defamation court battles in U.S. history."
 2016 - On behalf of Warner Chilcott (owned by Teva Pharmaceuticals), secured a judgment invalidating the patent for NuvaRing—the first combined contraceptive vaginal ring marketed in the U.S. The judgment struck down Merck & Co's patent infringement claims.
 2016 - Represented Verizon as Employment & Employee Benefits Counsel in Acquisition of Yahoo!
 2016 - Led by Dan Webb, released report regarding review of the Federal Civil Rights Litigation Division of the City of Chicago Department of Law
 2015 - Obtained a win before the U.S. Supreme Court on behalf of Omnicare Inc.
 In an antitrust lawsuit led by Jeffrey Kessler, representing a group of current and former college athletes seeking to strike down unlawful compensation restraints imposed by the NCAA on Division I men's basketball and football programs 
 Represented Luxottica Group S.p.A. in acquisitions, including its $1.6 billion hostile takeover of U.S. Shoe Corporation, owner of LensCrafters, in 1995 and its 2007 $2 billion acquisition of Oakley
 2007 - Assisted Lear Corporation in connection with the bid for the company by Carl Icahn.
 2006 - Represented the New York Stock Exchange in the Grasso compensation investigation and subsequent litigation
 2002 - Achieved a victory for Microsoft Corporation in the remedy phase of its battle against federal and state antitrust claims
 2001 - Counseled Barr Laboratories to invalidate a key patent on Prozac in a case Fortune magazine calls "the mother of all patent challenges"
 1994 - Defended General Electric in its industrial-diamond price-fixing case, led by Dan K. Webb

Notable current and former employees 
 Beryl Anthony Jr. - Congressman from Arkansas, former chairman of the Democratic Congressional Campaign Committee
Tim Broas - former United States Ambassador to the Netherlands
James H. Douglas Jr. - former United States Deputy Secretary of Defense
Bruce Downey - former CEO of Barr Pharmaceuticals
James R. Thompson - Former governor of Illinois
 Nathan Sawaya - artist
 Emily Giffin - author of Something Borrowed
 Thomas Kirsch - United States attorney for the United States District Court for the Northern District of Indiana
 Michael K. Atkinson - Inspector General of the Intelligence Community under the Office of the Director of National Intelligence 
 Eric Hargan - Deputy Secretary at the U.S. Department of Health and Human Services 
 Jeffrey Kessler - Winston & Strawn co-executive chairman and antitrust, sports law, and trial lawyer. Represented Tom Brady in Brady v. NFL, which led to the end of the 2011 NFL lockout.
 Dan Webb - Winston & Strawn co-executive chairman and U.S. trial lawyer who achieved successful prosecution of retired Admiral John Poindexter in the Iran-Contra affair. Previously the U.S. Attorney for the Northern District of Illinois. In 2017, he was named a Lifetime Achiever by The American Lawyer.
Abbe Lowell - His practice focuses on litigation, complex investigations and regulatory enforcement.
Earl Jinkinson - noted antitrust lawyer
Thomas M. Melsheimer - managing partner of the firm's Dallas office
Daniel Ninivaggi - former partner and of counsel, served as CEO of Icahn Enterprises from 2010 to 2014 and Federal-Mogul from 2014 to 2017. 
Matthew D. Orwig - former U.S. Attorney for the Eastern District of Texas, founder of the firm's Dallas office 
Jack O'Malley - former Cook County State's Attorney, heading the second-largest prosecutor's office in the United States 
Julissa Reynoso Pantaleón - United States Ambassador to Spain nominee, current chief of staff to First Lady Jill Biden, former United States ambassador to Uruguay 
Franklin R. Parker - former Assistant Secretary of the Navy (Manpower and Reserve Affairs) 
John Barton Payne - American politician, lawyer and judge, United States Secretary of the Interior from 1920 until 1921 under Woodrow Wilson's administration
Rob Pelinka - basketball player, general manager of the Los Angeles Lakers

See also
List of largest United States-based law firms by profits per partner

References

External links
Official Website

Law firms based in Chicago
Law firms established in 1853
Wrongful conviction advocacy
1853 establishments in Illinois
Foreign law firms with offices in Hong Kong